Ted Tatsuya Tsukiyama (December 13, 1920 – February 13, 2019) was a Japanese American attorney and bonsai enthusiast. During World War II he was a member of the Varsity Victory Volunteers, 442 Regimental Combat Team, and the Military Intelligence Service. He was the first Japanese American to graduate from Yale Law School.

Early life 
Tsukiyama was born on December 13, 1920, in Kaimuki, a neighborhood in Honolulu, Hawaii. He was raised in Japan until he was 6 years old, when he moved back to Hawaii. He graduated from Roosevelt High School.

Career 
When Pearl Harbor was attacked on December 7, 1941, he was a student at the University of Hawaii and a member of the ROTC. After the attack, he was a member of the Hawaii Territorial Guard, until all Japanese Americans in the Guard were dismissed from service because of their ancestry. He joined the newly-formed Varsity Victory Volunteers, then the 442nd Regimental Combat Team. Once he entered the military, he was assigned to the Military Intelligence Service, where he was ordered to serve in Burma, listening in on radio transmissions from the Japanese Air Force.

When World War II ended, Tsukiyama returned to his studies, transferring to Indiana University. He then attended Yale Law School, and was the first Japanese American to do so. After graduation, he became an attorney in Honolulu.

In 1951, he married his wife Fuku. They had three children.

Throughout his life, Tsukiyama was also a bonsai enthusiast. He helped found the Hawaii Bonsai Association with David Fukumoto, and in 1989 he helped to found the World Bonsai Friendship Federation. He earned an Order of the Rising Sun, Gold and Silver Rays in 2001 for his work with bonsai.

Tsukiyama died on February 13, 2019, from complications after a stroke.

Further reading

References

External links 

 Oral history interview
 Ted Tsukiyama Archival Collection

1920 births
2019 deaths
Indiana University alumni
University of Hawaiʻi alumni
Writers from Honolulu
Military personnel from Hawaii
Yale Law School alumni
American military personnel of Japanese descent
United States Army personnel of World War II
Bonsai artists
Hawaii lawyers
20th-century American lawyers
Recipients of the Order of the Rising Sun, 5th class